Wachusett Mountain State Reservation is a protected area encompassing  around the summit of Mount Wachusett in Massachusetts.

Activities and amenities
Roadway: An automobile road, open spring to fall, ascends the  summit. Views from the top of Mount Wachusett include Mount Monadnock to the north, Mount Greylock to the west, southern Vermont to the northwest and Boston to the east. 
Trails: The reservation's  of hiking and walking trails include a section of the Midstate Trail. 
Skiing: The privately operated Wachusett Mountain Ski Area occupies a  lease parcel on the northern slopes of the mountain.

References

External links
Wachusett Mountain State Reservation Department of Conservation and Recreation 
Trail Map Department of Conservation and Recreation 
Friends of Wachusett Mountain

State parks of Massachusetts
Parks in Worcester County, Massachusetts
Princeton, Massachusetts
Westminster, Massachusetts
Massachusetts natural resources